Lasiodiplodia is a genus of fungi in the family Botryosphaeriaceae. There were about 21 species. Lasiodiplodia, commonly referred to as black-soot disease, is a significant pathogen in tropical forestry.

Species
As accepted by Species Fungorum;

Lasiodiplodia americana 
Lasiodiplodia aquilariae 
Lasiodiplodia avicenniae 
Lasiodiplodia avicenniarum 
Lasiodiplodia brasiliensis 
Lasiodiplodia bruguierae 
Lasiodiplodia caatinguensis 
Lasiodiplodia chinensis 
Lasiodiplodia chonburiensis 
Lasiodiplodia cinnamomi 
Lasiodiplodia citri 
Lasiodiplodia citricola 
Lasiodiplodia crassispora 
Lasiodiplodia curvata 
Lasiodiplodia egyptiaca 
Lasiodiplodia endophytica 
Lasiodiplodia euphorbiaceicola 
Lasiodiplodia exigua 
Lasiodiplodia fiorii 
Lasiodiplodia frezaliana 
Lasiodiplodia gilanensis 
Lasiodiplodia gonubiensis 
Lasiodiplodia gravistriata 
Lasiodiplodia hormozganensis 
Lasiodiplodia hyalina 
Lasiodiplodia indica 
Lasiodiplodia iraniensis 
Lasiodiplodia irregularis 
Lasiodiplodia jatrophicola 
Lasiodiplodia krabiensis 
Lasiodiplodia laeliocattleyae 
Lasiodiplodia laosensis 
Lasiodiplodia lignicola 
Lasiodiplodia macroconidia 
Lasiodiplodia macrospora 
Lasiodiplodia magnoliae 
Lasiodiplodia mahajangana 
Lasiodiplodia margaritacea 
Lasiodiplodia marypalmiae 
Lasiodiplodia mediterranea 
Lasiodiplodia microconidia 
Lasiodiplodia missouriana 
Lasiodiplodia nigra 
Lasiodiplodia pandanicola 
Lasiodiplodia paraphysaria 
Lasiodiplodia parva 
Lasiodiplodia plurivora 
Lasiodiplodia pontae 
Lasiodiplodia pseudotheobromae 
Lasiodiplodia pyriformis 
Lasiodiplodia ricini 
Lasiodiplodia rubropurpurea 
Lasiodiplodia sterculiae 
Lasiodiplodia subglobosa 
Lasiodiplodia swieteniae 
Lasiodiplodia tenuiconidia 
Lasiodiplodia thailandica 
Lasiodiplodia theobromae 
Lasiodiplodia thomasiana 
Lasiodiplodia tropica 
Lasiodiplodia undulata 
Lasiodiplodia vaccinii 
Lasiodiplodia venezuelensis 
Lasiodiplodia viticola 
Lasiodiplodia vitis 

Former species;
 L. abnormis  = Granulodiplodia abnormis
 L. nigra  = Lasiodiplodia theobromae
 L. tubericola  = Lasiodiplodia theobromae
 L. triflorae  = Lasiodiplodia theobromae

References

External links
 

Botryosphaeriaceae
Dothideomycetes genera